SCLM may refer to:

 IBM Software Configuration and Library Manager, a set of programs for IBM mainframe computers
 Subcontinental lithospheric mantle, in geology
 SCLM, the ICAO code for Las Mercedes Airport (Chile)